Francis Foster Holden (29 March 1913 – 26 September 1988) was an Australian rules footballer who played with Geelong in the Victorian Football League (VFL).

Notes

External links 

1913 births
Australian rules footballers from Victoria (Australia)
Geelong Football Club players
1988 deaths